The Sakae Krang River is a tributary of the Chao Phraya River. It originates in Mae Wong National Park, Nakhon Sawan Province. It joins the Chao Phraya River in Uthai Thani city near the Wat Tha Sung (Tha Sung Temple).

According to the Tourism Authority of Thailand, the people of Uthai Thani use the Sakae Krang River to grow pandanus and to raise fish in floating baskets, which is the primary occupation of the Uthai Thani people.

Local names 
The Sakae Krang River has several local names. From its origin in the Western Forest Complex in Nakhon Sawan, it is called Huai Pha Daeng and then Huai Duea; while flowing along the border between Nakhon Sawan and Kamphaeng Phet provinces, it is known as Huai Mae Wong or Nam Mae Wong; while flowing through Nakhon Sawan again, it is sequentially called Nam Mae Wong, Nam Wang Ma and Nam Tak Daet; it becomes the Tak Daet River while passing Sawang Arom and Thap Than districts of Uthai Thani, and while forming the border between Mueang Uthai Thani District of Uthai Thani and Krok Phra District of Nakhon Sawan. Only its final section in Mueang Uthai Thani District is called the Sakae Krang River, which empties into the Chao Phraya River.

Tributaries

Main tributaries of the Sakae Krang River include Huai Thap Salao and Khlong Pho.

Sakae Krang Basin
The Sakae Krang is part of the Chao Phraya Watershed.

Flood of 2011
In 2011, after high rainfall and poor flood control management, much of the Sakae Krang River overflowed its banks between September to November that year. The new market a few kilometers away was also severely flooded for almost as long.

References

Rivers of Thailand